Ni rat ni mir (Odlomci iz trilogije) (trans. Neither War nor Peace (Passages from the Trilogy)) is a compilation album by Serbian and former Yugoslav rock band Galija. The features songs from Galija trilogy, which consists of the albums Daleko je Sunce, Korak do slobode and Istorija, ti i ja. The album also features songs "Pravo slavlje" and "Na Drini ćuprija" released in 1991 on the 7-inch single.

Track listing
"Pravo slavlje" - 4:15
"Žena koje nema" - 4:11
"Zebre i bizoni" - 2:59
"Da li si spavala" - 3:09
"Korak do slobode" - 2:52
"Kao i obično" - 4:02
"Noć" - 5:07
"Pevaju jutra" - 3:14
"Kad me pogledaš" - 4:38
"Na tvojim usnama" - 3:12
"Ljubavna pesma" - 3:30
"Trava" - 2:55
"Kao boja tvoga oka" - 5:35
"Sloboda" - 3:59
"Mi znamo sudbu" - 3:26
"Trube" - 3:35
"Na Drini ćuprija" - 2:54
"Skadarska" - 4:13
"Seti se maja" - 3:17

Credits
Nenad Milosavljević - vocals
Predrag Milosavljević - vocals
Jean Jacques Roscam - guitar
Bata Zlatković - flute
Dušan Karadžić - bass guitar
Boban Pavlović - drums
Zoran Radosavljević - bass guitar
Predrag Milanović - bass guitar

1991 compilation albums
PGP-RTB compilation albums
Galija compilation albums